Cabinet is a German brand of cigarettes, currently owned and manufactured by Reemtsma, a subsidiary of Imperial Brands (formerly, "Imperial Tobacco"). It is mainly sold and found in the New states of Germany.

History 

Cabinet cigarettes were introduced in the German Democratic Republic (GDR) in 1972 and were produced by the operating state-owned "VEB Tobacco Nordhausen" as well as the "Vereinigte Zigarettenfabriken" in Dresden. Before Reemtsma acquired the brand, monthly production was approximately 800 million cigarettes, and the market share was 33 percent in 1989. After Reemtsma took over the production, market share fell below 10 percent in 1990.

Production took place in Nordhausen until the late 1990s when the site was closed. Production continued at the headquarters of Langenhagen. After the German reunification, Reemtsma changed the Cabinet brand to accommodate Western standards; pollutants were reduced, and the tobaccos were remixed to be "lighter and wholesome". New variants and packaging were also introduced. Many GDR smokers, accustomed to stronger smoke, did not like the changes and the brand lost significant market share after the changes A 20-pack of Cabinet cigarettes in the GDR costed about 3.20 Deutsche Mark.

Markets
Cabinet was mainly sold in East Germany, but also was or is still sold in Germany and Poland.

Products
 Cabinet Red
 Cabinet Blue
 Cabinet Gold
 Cabinet Fresh
 Cabinet Spice

Below are all the current brands of Cabinet cigarettes sold including the levels of tar, nicotine and carbon monoxide.

See also

 Tobacco smoking

References

Imperial Brands brands